Mario Lanfranchi (30 June 1927 – 3 January 2022) was an Italian film, theatre, and television director, screenwriter, producer, collector, and actor.

Career 
Lanfranchi was born in Parma. After receiving a degree at the Drama Academy (Accademia dei Filodrammatici) of Milan in the early 1950s, he was hired by Sergio Pugliese at RAI, at the onset of Italian television. He was the first to bring opera to the small screen, in 1956, with Madama Butterfly, by Giacomo Puccini, which introduced to a wide public Anna Moffo, at that time an unknown American soprano, who became his wife for 17 years. In 1967 he began his career as a film director with the western movie Death Sentence. He lived in a 16th-century villa in Santa Maria del Piano outside Parma. 

Lanfranchi died in Langhirano, near Parma, on 3 January 2022, at the age of 94.

Opera TV productions and films 
 1956 – Madama Butterfly – Anna Moffo, Renato Cioni, Miti Truccato Pace, Afro Poli
 1956 – La fanciulla del West – Gigliola Frazzoni, Ken Neate, Mario Petri
 1956 – La sonnambula – Anna Moffo, Danilo Vega, Plinio Clabassi
 1958 – Turandot – Lucille Udovich, Franco Corelli, Renata Mattioli, Plinio Clabassi
 1959 – Lucia di Lammermoor – Anna Moffo, Nicola Filacuridi, Dino Dondi, Ferruccio Mazzoli
 1960 – Tosca – Magda Olivero, Alvinio Misciano, Giulio Fioravanti
 1962 – La serva padrona – Anna Moffo, Paolo Montarsolo
 1968 – La traviata – Anna Moffo, Franco Bonisolli, Gino Bechi (film)
 1971 – Lucia di Lammermoor – Anna Moffo, Lajos Kozma, Giulio Fioravanti, Paolo Washington (film)

References

External links 
 
 

1927 births
2022 deaths
20th-century Italian male actors
20th-century Italian male writers
20th-century Italian screenwriters
Italian film directors
Italian television directors
Italian theatre directors
Italian male screenwriters
Italian television producers
Impresarios
Italian male actors
Book and manuscript collectors
People in greyhound racing
Actors from Parma